Six vessels of the Royal Navy have borne the name HMS Pitt:

 was an 8-gun cutter purchased in 1763 that foundered in the Atlantic in 1766, "coming from Africa".
 was a 12-gun schooner purchased in 1805, renamed Sandwich  in 1807, and broken up in 1809.
 was a 36-gun Perseverance-class fifth rate frigate launched as HMS Pitt in 1805, but was renamed Salsette in 1807, and was broken up in 1874.
 was named Salsette before her acquisition by the Royal Navy, renamed Pitt, and then Doris in 1807, and sold at Valparaiso in 1829.
 was a 74-gun third rate launched in 1816, became a coal hulk in 1853, and was broken up in 1877.
HMS Pitt was a screw 91-gun second rate ordered in 1860 but cancelled in 1863.
 was a 106-gun first rate launched in 1820, renamed Camperdown in 1825, on harbour service in 1854, coal hulk in 1857, renamed Pitt in 1882, and sold 1906.

See also
HM hired armed brig , which served between c.1808 and 1812.

Citations

References
 
 

Royal Navy ship names